Grandeza (Portuguese and Capeverdean Creole for "Greatness")' is an album recorded by Val Xalino.  The album was released in 2004 and is named after a sixth single made by Eddy Moreno released in 1981.  The album features nine tracks including "Grandeza" and "Corpin sebin"  The album was composed by Val and Robert Xalino.  It features some cover versions of the singles made by Eddy Moreno and Djô D’Eloy.

Eddy Moreno was the uncle of Val Xalino.

Track listing

See also
Val Xalino

References

2004 albums
Albums by Val Xalino